The 2022–23 season is the 123rd season in the history of Eintracht Frankfurt, a football club based in Frankfurt, Germany. In addition to the domestic league, Eintracht Frankfurt also participates in this season's edition of the domestic cup, the DFB-Pokal, and the UEFA Champions League. This is the 98th season for Frankfurt in the Deutsche Bank Park, located in Frankfurt, Hesse, Germany. The season covers a period from 1 July 2022 to 30 June 2023.

Players

Squad

Players out on loan

Transfers

In

Out

Friendly matches

Competitions

Overall record

Bundesliga

League table

Results summary

Results by round

Matches

DFB-Pokal

UEFA Super Cup

UEFA Champions League

Group stage

Knockout phase

Round of 16
The round of 16 draw was held on 7 November 2022.

Statistics

Appearances and goals

|-
! colspan=14 style=background:#dcdcdc; text-align:center| Goalkeepers

|-
! colspan=14 style=background:#dcdcdc; text-align:center| Defenders

|-
! colspan=14 style=background:#dcdcdc; text-align:center| Midfielders

|-
! colspan=14 style=background:#dcdcdc; text-align:center| Forwards

|-
! colspan=14 style=background:#dcdcdc; text-align:center| Players transferred out during the season

Goalscorers

Last updated: 19 March 2023

Clean sheets

Last updated: 19 March 2023

Disciplinary record

Last updated: 19 March 2023

References

External links
 Official English Eintracht website 
 German archive site
 2021–22 Eintracht Frankfurt season at kicker.de 
 2022–23 Eintracht Frankfurt season at Fussballdaten.de 
 

 

2022-23
German football clubs 2022–23 season
2022–23 UEFA Champions League participants seasons